The Honduran Olympic Committee is the Committee that represents the Honduras athletes in the International Olympic Committee (IOC), created in 1956 and recognized by the International Olympic Committee that same year.

See also 

 Honduras at the Olympics

References

External links 
 Official website

National Olympic Committees
Honduras at the Olympics
Oly